"El Mareo" is a song by Argentinian-Uruguayan band Bajofondo featuring vocals by the famous Argentine rock musician Gustavo Cerati.
After their successful single "Pa' Bailar" featuring Japanese bandoneonist Ryōta Komatsu and just before starting their tour through North and Latin America, the band decided to make "El Mareo" the second single from 2007s album Mar Dulce. The song was nominated on the 2008 Latin Grammy Awards, as Best Alternative Song.

Music video
The music video for the single shows the band playing the song, and Santaolalla and Cerati singing in grayscale effect.

Miscellaneous

Notes

Bajofondo songs
2007 songs
2008 singles
Song recordings produced by Gustavo Santaolalla
Songs written by Juan Campodónico